The South Texas Building is a twelve-story building in San Antonio, Texas, United States. It was built in 1919. At that time it was the tallest building in San Antonio.

Buildings and structures in San Antonio